Birgit Arrhenius (born 25 August 1932) is a Swedish archaeologist and professor emeritus at Stockholm University. She was a professor of laboratory archaeology, and the first head of the university's Archaeological Research Laboratory. Her work has studied places including Helgö and Mälaren, and she has researched prehistoric pressblech and garnet cloisonné work. Arrhenius is a member of the Royal Swedish Academy of Sciences, and was in 1992 the recipient of the Royal Patriotic Society's Gösta Berg Medal.

Career

Birgit Arrhenius was born Birgit Klein on 25 August 1932. She was one of six children of Gerda Klein and her husband Oskar Klein, a Swedish theoretical physicist who taught at Stockholm University. Expenses were tight, and her father nearly turned down the award of the Order of the Polar Star until the dean provided for the significant cost of dressing for such an award's ceremony.

Arrhenius, like her father, became a professor at Stockholm University. She served from 1986 to 1998 as Professor of Laboratory Archaeology, and was the first head of the Archaeological Research Laboratory, founded in 1976, at the university. She participated in the excavation and publication of finds from archaeological sites at Helgö and Björkö. A 1983 paper suggested a reanalysis of the chronology of the graves found in Vendel, and in 1992 she demonstrated through laser scanning that a dancing warrior on one of the Torslunda plates, cast bronze dies used to make helmet decorations, had had its eye sharply struck out in a possible invocation of the one-eyed Germanic god Odin.

On 1 October 1991 Arrhenius was elected to the Royal Swedish Academy of Letters, History and Antiquities, and the following year she was awarded the Gösta Berg Medal, intended for those who have made "outstanding efforts" in the areas of cultural heritage, by the Royal Patriotic Society. Arrhenius is a professor emeritus at Stockholm University.

Publications

References

Bibliography
  
  
  
  
  

Swedish archaeologists
Swedish women scientists
1932 births
Living people
Swedish women archaeologists
Academic staff of Stockholm University
Members of the Royal Swedish Academy of Sciences